Laurence Pearce is an English professional rugby league and rugby union player. He has played club level rugby league (RL) in the Super League for Hull F.C. (2011–12), and as of 2017 he plays for Mont-de-Marsan, as a back row. Laurence Pearce joined Aviva Premiership club Leicester Tigers at the beginning of the 2014/15 season from RFU Championship club Rotherham Titans. In early March 2016 it was announced Pearce would join Sale Sharks from Leicester Tigers.

In his 2-year spell at Leicester Tigers Pearce made 28 appearances, scoring 8 tries.

References

External links
 (archived by web.archive.org) Stats – Past Players – P
 (archived by web.archive.org) Profile at hullfc.com

1990 births
Living people
Doncaster Knights players
English rugby league players
English rugby union players
Hull F.C. players
Leicester Tigers players
Rotherham Titans players
Rugby league players from Lincolnshire
Rugby union players from Grantham
Sale Sharks players
Stade Montois players
SU Agen Lot-et-Garonne players